Kam Nai-wai MH (born 1960, Hong Kong) is a founding member of the Democratic Party, and was a former member of Central and Western District Council. He is also a former member of the Legislative Council of Hong Kong (Geographical constituency, Hong Kong Island). His profession is as a social worker and he is a director of an IT company.

Kam served on the former Urban Council and district councils from 1995.

Political career
In 2007, Kam planned to participate in 2007 Hong Kong Island by-election after the former chairman of DAB, Ma Lik, died of colon cancer. He later withdrew from the election process, denying that it was under pressure from fellow democrats who feared splitting the vote with Anson Chan. He won praise for his support for victims of the Lehman minibonds saga in 2008.

In the 2008 Hong Kong legislative election he won the Hong Kong Island geographical constituency seat for the Democratic Party.

Views, policy positions and Legco voting
In June 2010, he voted with the party in favour of the government's 2012 constitutional reform package, which included the late amendment by the Democratic Party – accepted by the Beijing government – to hold a popular vote for five new District Council functional constituencies.

Personal life
Kam is married to Candy.

External links
  Nai Wai Kam's hk.myblog.yahoo website

References

1960 births
Living people
Alumni of the City University of Hong Kong
Alumni of Hong Kong Baptist University
Members of the Urban Council of Hong Kong
District councillors of Central and Western District
Hong Kong businesspeople
Hong Kong social workers
Charter 08 signatories
Democratic Party (Hong Kong) politicians
HK LegCo Members 2008–2012